is the nickname for the , an experimental wind power plant established in Kanagawa-ku, Yokohama, Kanagawa Prefecture, Japan in April 2007.

The turbine has an output of 1,980 kW (enough power for 860 homes), and its purpose is to publicize environmentally friendly alternative energy sources while providing electricity to the Minato Mirai 21 district.

Sources 
Yokohama, an environmentally friendly city
https://web.archive.org/web/20081224000854/http://www.city.yokohama.jp/me/kankyou/ondan/furyoku/ Japanese
City of Yokohama Newsletter

Wind turbines
Wind farms in Japan
Buildings and structures in Yokohama
Energy infrastructure completed in 2007
2007 establishments in Japan